Salduba is a genus of flies in the family Stratiomyidae.

Species
Salduba areolaris Walker, 1864
Salduba austeni Kertész, 1908
Salduba australis James, 1950
Salduba carinifrons (Enderlein, 1921)
Salduba confusa Kertész, 1908
Salduba cothurnata (Bigot, 1878)
Salduba diphysoides Walker, 1858
Salduba elegans Kertész, 1908
Salduba gradiens Walker, 1864
Salduba inermis Kertész, 1908
Salduba lugubris Walker, 1861
Salduba maxima Kertész, 1908

References

Stratiomyidae
Brachycera genera
Taxa named by Francis Walker (entomologist)
Diptera of Australasia